Benjamin Schwartz (born September 15, 1981) is an American comedian and actor. He has guest starred as Jean-Ralphio Saperstein on the NBC sitcom Parks and Recreation and Clyde Oberholt on the Showtime series House of Lies; voiced Randy Cunningham in Randy Cunningham: 9th Grade Ninja, Dewey Duck in DuckTales, and Leonardo in Rise of the Teenage Mutant Ninja Turtles; and appeared many times in the CollegeHumor web series Jake and Amir.

Schwartz voices the title character in Sonic the Hedgehog (2020) and Sonic the Hedgehog 2 (2022). His film career also includes roles in Peep World; Everybody's Fine; The Other Guys; The Walk; This Is Where I Leave You; Standing Up, Falling Down; and Flora & Ulysses. On television, he has starred in the Netflix comedy series Space Force (2020–2022) and the Apple TV+ crime comedy series The Afterparty in 2022.

Early life
Benjamin Schwartz was born on September 15, 1981 in The Bronx, New York City. His parents, both Bronx natives, raised Schwartz in Riverdale, a neighborhood in the Northwestern part of the Bronx. His father was a social worker before going into real estate and his mother was a music teacher at P.S. 24, an elementary school in Riverdale. He also has a sister named Marni. In an interview with Kevin Pollak, he stated, "When I told people I was from the Bronx, it was like 'Oh, do you have bullet wounds?' And I'm like 'No, it's just me and, like, Jewish people.'"

When he was eleven years old, his family moved to Edgemont, New York, in adjacent Westchester County. Schwartz attended Edgemont Junior–Senior High School where he played basketball and sang in the chorus; he graduated in 1999. He then attended Union College, graduating in 2003 with a double major in psychology and anthropology.

Career

On television, Schwartz guest-starred as Jean-Ralphio Saperstein on NBC's Parks and Recreation and was a lead in the Showtime show House of Lies. In 2010, Schwartz played series regular Bill Hoyt on J. J. Abrams' one-hour spy drama Undercovers for NBC.

Schwartz had his own segment on HBO's Funny or Die Presents called Terrible Decisions with Ben Schwartz and has appeared in multiple CollegeHumor sketches including the popular web series Jake and Amir.

Schwartz has been nominated for three Emmys and won the 2009 Emmy Award for Outstanding Original Music and Lyrics for coauthoring Hugh Jackman's opening number for the 81st Academy Awards.

Schwartz voiced Randy Cunningham, a 14-year-old freshman student and ninja protecting his hometown Norrisville from forces of evil in Randy Cunningham: 9th Grade Ninja.

In September 2013, he was hired by Paramount Pictures to re-make the 1991 comedy Soapdish, retitled El Fuego Caliente and reworking the original's American soap opera into a Latin telenovela, with producers Rob Reiner and Alan Greisman and he sold an original pitch to Universal Studios based on an idea by Brian Grazer with Imagine Entertainment attached to produce. He was a staff writer for the third season of Adult Swim's Robot Chicken and served as a freelance writer for the Weekend Update segment of Saturday Night Live as well as the monologues for the Late Show with David Letterman.

Schwartz is an alumnus of the Upright Citizens Brigade Theatre (UCBT). He was a member of the improv group "Hot Sauce" with Adam Pally and Gil Ozeri. The group performed their long-form improv show "Something Fresh" at UCBT every month.

He and Bill Hader served as vocal consultants for Star Wars: The Force Awakens. Schwartz also played a cameo role as a Stormtrooper in the film.

Since 2014 Schwartz has appeared in episodes of the Comedy Bang! Bang! podcast as the only guest in "Solo Bolo" (2014), "Solo Bolo Dos Lo" (2015), "Solo Bolo Trolo" (2016), "Solo Bolo Cuatrolo" (2016), "Solo Bolo Cincolo" (2017), "Solo Bolo Sonicolo" (2020), and "Solo Bolo Hallowolo" (2021). In nearly each episode he and host Scott Aukerman compete in the Olympic Song Challenge. Ben has also appeared on episodes of comedy podcasts If I Were You, ID1OT, You Made It Weird with Pete Holmes, and Conan O'Brien Needs a Friend.

In 2017, Schwartz began voicing Dewey Duck in the Disney XD revival of DuckTales. Schwartz has been featured as himself in Netflix's Home: Adventures with Tip & Oh'''s 2017 animated Christmas special - Home for the Holidays - alongside Kelly Clarkson. He provided the voice of Leonardo in Rise of the Teenage Mutant Ninja Turtles. In August 2018, Schwartz was announced to voice the titular character in the 2020 film Sonic the Hedgehog.

On September 26, 2019, it was announced that Schwartz was cast as F. Tony Scarapiducci in the Netflix comedy series Space Force.

Ben Schwartz co-starred alongside Billy Crystal in the movie Standing Up, Falling Down, initially released on April 25, 2019.

In April 2020, Schwartz and fellow comedian Thomas Middleditch starred in Netflix's first long-form improv special, Middleditch and Schwartz, a three-part series of hour-long performances filmed at New York University's Skirball Center for the Performing Arts. 

In 2022, Schwartz was in the main cast of the Apple TV+ mystery comedy series The Afterparty.

In January 2023, Schwartz guest voiced a character, TAY-0, a droid who participates in races for Cid, on Star Wars: The Bad Batch.

Books
Schwartz has co-written four books, three with writer Amanda McCall: Grandma's Dead: Breaking Bad News with Baby Animals; Maybe Your Leg Will Grow Back!: Looking on the Bright Side with Baby Animals and Why is Daddy in a Dress?: Asking Awkward Questions with Baby Animals and (with writer Laura Moses), Things You Should Already Know About Dating, You F-king Idiot''.

Filmography

Film

Television

Web series

Video games

References

External links

Living people
Male actors from New York City
American male comedians
American male film actors
American male television actors
American male voice actors
American television writers
American male television writers
Union College (New York) alumni
People from the Bronx
21st-century American male actors
Comedians from New York City
Upright Citizens Brigade Theater performers
Screenwriters from New York (state)
21st-century American comedians
1981 births
21st-century American screenwriters
American people of Jewish descent
Edgemont Junior – Senior High School alumni
21st-century American male writers